Saint Martins station is a SEPTA Regional Rail station in Philadelphia, Pennsylvania. Located at 311 West Springfield Avenue near the intersection of West Willow Grove and Seminole Avenues, it serves the Chestnut Hill West Line. The station was built by the Pennsylvania Railroad in 1883 and was known as Wissahickon Heights until 1906. The station and adjoining St Martins/St Martin's Lane take their present name from the Church of Saint Martin in the Fields, which stands a few hundred feet to the west.

The station is in zone 2 on the Chestnut Hill West Line and is 10.9 track miles from Suburban Station. In 2004, this station saw 215 boardings on an average weekday. It serves numerous Springside Chestnut Hill Academy students daily. It is also a contributing property of the Chestnut Hill Historic District.

The bridge that carries Willow Grove Avenue over the tracks was under repair from Fall 2005 to late Summer 2006, and has a 3-ton weight limit. The bridge was replaced in the summer of 2016.

Station layout

References

External links
 SEPTA - Saint Martins Station
 2000 Kevin Leary photo
 Springfield Avenue entrance from Google Maps Street View
 Willow Grove Avenue entrance from Google Maps Street View

SEPTA Regional Rail stations
Former Pennsylvania Railroad stations
Railway stations in the United States opened in 1883
Railway stations in Philadelphia